Wild Iris may refer to:

 Wild forms of the plant Iris
 Dietes grandiflora, or large wild iris
 Dietes bicolor, or yellow wild iris
 Dietes iridioides, or wild iris
 Wild Iris (film), 2001
 The Wild Iris, a 1992 poetry book by Louise Glück
 Wild Iris, a 1974 art work at the Delaware Art Museum
 Wild Iris, a horse, winner of the 2004 Adrian Knox Stakes